Fredonia Manufacturing Company was a manufacturer of automobiles in Youngstown, Ohio, United States.

The 1904 Fredonia Runabout was a runabout model.  It could seat 2 passengers and sold for US$1000.  The flat-mounted water-cooled single-cylinder engine, situated at the center of the car, produced 9 hp (6.7 kW).  The channel steel-framed car weighed 1300 lb (590 kg) and used full elliptic springs.

The 1904 Fredonia Tonneau was a tonneau model.  It could seat 5 passengers and sold for US$1250.  The flat-mounted water-cooled single-cylinder engine, situated amidships of the car, produced 10 hp (7.5 kW).  A 2-speed planetary transmission was fitted as on the Ford Model A and other Detroit cars of the time.  The channel steel-framed car weighed 1650 lb (748 kg) and used full elliptic springs like the Runabout.

References

 Frank Leslie's Popular Monthly (January, 1904)

Vintage vehicles
Defunct motor vehicle manufacturers of the United States
Motor vehicle manufacturers based in Ohio
Companies based in Youngstown, Ohio
Defunct manufacturing companies based in Ohio